Myingun Island, also known as Myengu Island, is an island in the Bay of Bengal. It is administrated by Myanmar and belongs to Rakhine State.

Geography 
There are two localities on the island, Sandawshin in the south and Pyaingdaung in the north. Both villages are located on the eastern coast of the island.

See also 
 List of islands of Myanmar

References

External links 
 Myingun Island 地圖 - Location

Islands of Myanmar